is a Japanese tokusatsu television series produced by Toei Company and Bandai. It is the fifteenth entry of the Super Sentai metaseries, following the previous series Chikyu Sentai Fiveman. The series aired on TV Asahi on February 15, 1991, to February 14, 1992, with a total of 51 episodes replacing Chikyu Sentai Fiveman and was replaced by Kyōryū Sentai Zyuranger. It was the last Sentai series until Ressha Sentai ToQger to not get adapted into a Power Rangers series. It was also the first series to have a third robot, Tetraboy.  The international English title is listed by Toei as simply Jetman.

Shout! Factory released this series in North America on September 25, 2018. This is the 10th incarnation of Super Sentai to be released in North America and was the first series released that did not have a Power Rangers counterpart.

Plot
This series takes place in 199X. On the Earth Ship, the command center of a defense agency called Sky Force, the guardians of peace on Earth, scientists have developed "Birdonic Waves", a newly developed technology that gives the subject superhuman abilities. Experiments called "J-Project" were successful. Aya Odagiri, the director of the project, chooses five elite Sky Force officials from Earth to use this technology. Ryu Tendo, one of the Sky Force officers, is successfully exposed to the Birdonic Waves, making him the first Jetman, the Red Hawk.

However, the Earth Ship is suddenly attacked by Vyram, an evil outer-dimensional organization bent on inter-dimensional domination. They successfully destroy the ship, apparently killing Ryu's lover and fellow candidate member Rie. In the chaos, the remaining Birdonic Waves for the other four officials become scattered on Earth, hitting four civilians. Odagiri and Tendo successfully escape and begin searching on Earth for the four remaining Jetmen, training them to aid them in stopping Vyram's plans of conquering their dimension.

The series later follows the tribulations of Ryu as he learns of Rie's survival and enlistment in the Vyram forces, as well as a love triangle between Gai, Ryu, and Kaori.

Characters

Earth Defence Force Sky Force
 is the military organization the Jetmen belong to.

Jetmen
Each Jetman later gains the  handgun, which can combine with the Bird Blaster to form the  rifle.

Ryu Tendo
/, born on May 10, 1965, is 25 years old at the beginning of the series, but his 26th birthday occurs in episode 13. He is originally a Sky Force soldier codenamed "W6" and leader of the Jetmen. Being the only member of the Jetmen who is of military background, his policy is to be always professional and never let feelings affect himself in battle, and he expects the same from his teammates. This leads to a conflict when he discovers that his beloved Rie has become Maria, eventually coming to terms with the revelation as he resolves to save Rie from the Vyram control. However, Rie's death at the hands of his nemesis Radiguet proves to be the last straw, causing him to challenge Radiguet alone before Kaori consoles Ryu and encourages him to stay true to his own belief in justice rather than revenge. Three years later, he marries Kaori.
Attacks: 

Kaori Rokumeikan
/ is the 22-year-old heiress of the Rokumeikan Enterprises empire. She is taken care of by her butler, since her parents reside in New York City. She becomes a Jetman to escape the boredom of her heiress life. She is good at Kendo and is the best shot among the Jetmen. She was in the middle of a love triangle with Ryu and Gai. She was also learning through hardships brought on by her new profession as it clashed with her life as a spoiled rich girl while figuring out what are truly important to herself. She was once engaged to a wealthy businessman named Soichiro Kitaoji and was close to marrying him, but she quickly ended their relationship when she saw his selfishness in contrast to her team's selfless determination as warriors of justice. She does sometimes use her wealth to help the team, like when she purchased a large number of diamonds and other jewels to try and snap Ako out of the curse of the dimensional monster Diamond Dimension. At the end of the series, she marries Ryu.

Raita Oishi
/ is a 22-year-old large-framed, eyeglasses-wearing nature lover who enjoys vegetables and hates Vyram for their destruction of nature. He was raised by his grandmother, Kiyo, because his parents were busy running a restaurant. He harbors a crush for Kaori, vowing to be there for her even if he has no chance with her, although eventually, his ultimate subject of affection turns out to be his childhood friend, Satsuki. As Yellow Owl, he specializes in raw strength techniques like head butts, body blows, sumo-based techniques, and hurling boulders. Three years after Vyram is defeated, he runs a farm with Satsuki.

Ako Hayasaka
/ is an 18-year-old senior student at Miharakita High School and a bright and cheerful girl who wants to marry a rich man. She first thought of being a Jetman as just a high-paying job, but her first battle helps her sense of justice take hold and makes her realize that she must use her newfound power to protect Earth. She is best friends with her classmate, Kyoko, who learns of her true identity during the Voice Dimension incident. From the Trash Dimension incident, the monster being her childhood toy Teddy, Ako learns of how wasteful humans can be. She debuts as an idol singer three years after the fall of Vyram.
Attacks: , Double Kick (with White Swan).

Gai Yuki
/ is the 26-year-old second-in-command of the Jetmen and a loner who hates being told what to do. Gai loves challenges and risks and is a womanizer and an avid if occasional gambler. his fighting styles are street fighting and mixed martial arts: his combat skills match those of Ryu, though he fights dirty and hits below the belt sometimes. He initially clashes with the straight-laced Ryu when drafted against his will but eventually comes to respect Ryu's largely principled disposition (Ryu falters only over the issue of his lost girlfriend, something Gai, being a womanizer, can sympathize with), ultimately becoming friends with him. He loves Kaori and often tries to flirt with her, leading to much frustration due to his initially unreciprocated feelings. When she finally accepts him, they frequently have problems in their relationship as they are too different. He later develops a rivalry with Vyram general Grey. He defeats Grey in their final encounter, in which a part of his helmet was damaged. Three years after Vyram's defeat, while buying a bouquet for Ryu and Kaori's wedding, he intervenes in a robbery and is stabbed in the stomach for the trouble. He makes it to the church after the wedding and talks to Ryu before he dies of his wound, passing it off as a hangover, satisfied that everyone he cares for has found happiness. In the manga, his position on the team is taken by Jeffrey Kensaki, a new hero who takes on the powers of Green Eagle.
Attacks: , Condor Owl Towering Attack (with Yellow Owl).

Allies

Aya Odagiri
 is the first female commander in the Super Sentai franchise. She is good at martial arts, and the inventor of the team vehicles. She is both caring and stern to the Jetmen, and she is not above fighting alongside those under her charge and even personally covering their maneuvers if necessary. As befitting to her status as the Jetman team's commanding officer, her subordinates call her simply . She is also an able pilot, having flown Sky Force aircraft and even Jet Garuda on two occasions.

Supreme Commander Ichijo
: A Sky Force officer who cares only for himself and bears a grudge against Commander Odagiri for being the commanding officer in the Jetmen project, which fell to civilians. With his Neo Jetmen, Ichijo gains appointment to assume command of Sky Camp base, bent on making Odagiri suffer while removing her Jetmen from the picture. However, he subsequently proves himself to be utterly incompetent in his new capacity when Bio-Dimension Beast Meteor BEM infiltrates and wreaks havoc within Sky Camp, being instantly demoralized at the first sign of Meteor BEM gaining the upper hand, refusing to even defend himself when offered the option to do so, and trapping his own Neo Jetmen team (and Odagiri, who is attempting to aid the Neo Jetmen at the time) with the monster in a futile act of desperation. It is implied at the end of Episode 41 that Sky Force has since removed Ichijo from command and reinstated Odagiri in the aftermath of the attack.

Neo Jetmen
, J1 through J5, are a team created by Supreme Commander Ichijo to replace the Jetmen, having Birdonic Reactors implanted in bodies, bypassing the need for regular exposure to Birdonic Waves. All five wield  guns and  grenades, and their group attack is the Flare Buster twin cannon. They eventually give the Birdonic energies to the original Jetmen in order to restore their powers.

Others
: The last three warriors of Dimensia, a realm in the Reverse Dimension destroyed by Vyram. While Ray and Kanna working with the Jetmen in their fight against Semimaru, Dan becomes romantically interested at Ako when they meet, causing him to express his feelings in a comical fashion. After Ray and Kanna are killed by Radiguet when he hijacks Jet Garuda, Dan assumes his fighting form and is mortally wounded taking the robot back from Radiguet. He dies soon after Ako expresses her feelings about him.
: The two warriors from the Berserk region, destroyed by Vyram force under Radiguet whose people can change anything they hold into weapons, though they can give up that very power to save a life instead. Arriving to Earth, while  is cared for by the Jetmen,  attempts to kill Radiguet. However, after Ru realizes the error of her ways and Duran is saved from the control of the monster Armor Snake, the two leave Earth to find a world they can find peace in.

Dimensional War Party Vyram
The  appears as a clan of outer-dimensional nobles, who conquered many worlds in the Reverse Dimension, and are now moving on to Front Dimension, ours. They boast about having achieved godhood, while they despise humans and see them as stupid and worthless. After their leader got lost in the Reverse Dimension, its four leading members compete in a game to defeat the Jetmen with the prize being full-leadership. Tran eventually becomes powerful enough to assume command, but is deposed by Radiguet, who leads Vyram up to its destruction.

Radiguet
: A cold-hearted officer who is the nearest presence to a leader of the Vyram, refusing to acknowledge anyone above and will do anything to accomplish his goals including being the one who kills the Jetmen. When Juuza returned to power, Radiguet attempts to kill her and ends being punished for his treachery by living as a human with no memory of his life in Vyram. Cared for by Saki, a girl on the verge of death, Radiguet unconsciously saves her life with his power. But though he wanted nothing to do with his past, Radiguet eventually regains his memories and helps the Jetmen in fighting Juuza. After killing Juuza to acquire Semimaru, Radiguet kills Saki to discard his humanity before nurturing Semimaru to assume its adult form though it was destroyed by the Great Icarus. Radiguet later attempts to bring the Demons under his control, managing to succeed with Ramon when he absorbed Gorg. When Tranza takes over the Vyram throne, Radiguet attempts to kill him, only to be made an example of by the stronger opponent and forced into humbling himself before Tranza. Baring a terrible grudge against Tranza since then, Radiguet allied himself with Maria and Grey to summon the meteor used to create Meteor BEM to take out the Jetmen, enraged to find Tranza used his plan as a springboard from his own scheme. Attempting to sabotage Veronica, Radiguet is hooked up to have his life force sucked out. However, instead of having the life sucked out of him, Radiguet drains Veronica's power. Later, after using the Jetmen to do his dirty work, Radiguet tortures Tranza before breaking his mind and leaving him powerless, becoming Vyram's leader. Ultimately, the side effects of his power boost manifest in his newly gained giant form, the armored . After killing Rie so Red Hawk could not have her, Radiguet battles him until the other Jetmen arrive. After the five Jetmen defeat him, Radiguet assumes his Raguem form which not even the Great Icarus is a match for until the Tetraboy punches the weak point Rie made. To counter their advantage over him, Raguem assimilates the Vylock into armor that he uses to overpower Tetraboy. The Great Icarus separates and Ryu uses the Jet Garuda to rip the armor off and the others destroy both the Jet Garuda and Raguem. Radiguet says that his soul will continue to curse the Jetmen for eternity from the Reverse Dimension before he explodes.

Tran
 is a psychokinetic child who suggested a game to settle who would be Vyram's new leader. He specialized into creating toy-ish monsters to satisfy his fun desires, and thought both enemy or ally fatalities as "just part of the fun". Being the youngest of the Vyram was a big complex to him until his failed attempt to take out the Jetmen during their retreat to the Yamada Ranch was the last straw. The constant anger became unbearable to the point of Tran using it to accelerate his growth. With his new-found power and maturity,  easily defeats both his comrades and the Jetmen for underestimating him before seizing leadership of Vyram. In addition to his psychokinetic powers from his gauntlet, and new-found arrogant nature, he can now assume disguises and wields the  blade. After his giant robot  was ruined by Radiguet, and after completing his new Bio Gun, Tranza heads out to hunt both him and the Jetmen down. Fighting the entire Jetman team on his own, Tranza uses his Bio Gun to turn each Jetman member into a rock plate until only Ryu remained. However, with Radiguet aiding Red Hawk before betraying him, the Bio Gun is destroyed by Red Hawk's charged Bringer Sword and the others are freed with the destruction of Tranza's gauntlet as they use the Fire Bazooka on Tranza. Though he survives the attacks, Radiguet tortures Tranza before sparring him to live with a severe brain injury at the Joutou Neurosurgery Hospital.

Maria
Though originally to be a Jetman, Vyram's attack on the Earth Ship resulted with Rie being sucked into space. However, Rie is saved by Radiguet, who brainwashed her to be devoid of her memories as a human and made an official of Vyram. However, though he loved her and tells her that she is his, Maria defies Radiguet to suit her own agenda to be leader of Vyram. She loves to battle, and her methods are cruel and cold. She is armed with the Necrod, which has sword, gun, and whip modes. The monsters created by her were often motivated by envy, and attacked mainly women. Since the Camera Dimension incident, unconsciously playing the piano, Maria develops a relationship with Grey. Since then, she played piano music for Grey despite not knowing why, until her identity was found out and the relationship got difficult. Grey was willing to let her go if it made her happy. During the Demons incident, Maria momentarily reverted to Rie until Radiguet forced her back to her Vyram persona with a vendetta against Red Hawk. Eventually forfeiting their contest, Maria accepts Radiguet's proposal of ruling by his side in return of becoming even stronger than she is now. As a result, Maria is infected by a cell born from Radiguet's blood that turns her into a vampiric beast as she targets men, though unaware that she would transform into mindless puppet overtime. While fighting Ryu, Maria assumes her monstrous form as she battles Red Hawk before assuming Rie's appearance to catch him off guard as the cell transfers itself to Ryu in order to have him take out the Jetmen. While Ryu manages to return to normal, Maria is in the final stage of her transformation as she defeats the other Jetmen before Ryu arrives and manages to reach Rie, causing Maria to remember her true self as she reverts to her true form. When Radiguet comes to reclaim her, Rie pretends that she will go with him, only to stab him in the back before he mortally wounds her. Before her death, Rie asks Ryu to leave her out of it before being spirited away by Grey. Her ghost later appeared in the finale, saying farewell to Ryu after his marriage to Kaori.

Grey
 is a robot who ironically was always the most reasoning member of the Vyram. Despite being a robot, he showed human feelings, especially love for wine, music, cigars, and particularly Maria, learning to play the piano from example. As a result, Grey supports Maria in shielding her when fighting Jetman, seeing Gai Yuki as an ideal rival. Learning of Radiguet's plan for her, Grey attempts to talk Maria out of it to no avail. This forces Grey to ask the Jetmen to save Maria. However, he instead takes her dying body away as he takes her death hard. With nothing to live for other than his code as a soldier, Grey calls the Jetmen out in a final match, with Gai wanting to fight him alone. Eventually, Grey is mortally damaged as Gai lit one last cigar for him as a sign of acknowledgment as a worthy rival before Grey shuts down.

Empress Juuza
 is the true leader of Vyram, referring to herself as mother of all creation, Juuza along her underlings Radiguet, Grey, and Tran had conquered many dimensions. While able to teleport, fire lasers from her hook use telekinesis, being intangible, and breathe fire in her human form, Juuza can become  where she fires a beam from her eyes, bullets from her fingers, and shock-waves and beams from her mouth, as well as become an intangible head. Thought to be killed during the Reverse Dimension Invasion War, she actually went under a long sleep after acquiring  and incubating it, and came to Earth via a meteorite. She makes her presence known by causing a momentary blackout across the city. By the time the Jetmen investigate, finding Radiguet as he was about to kill her while asleep, Juuza emerges and resumes control of Vyram. She then proceeds to use the humans' pain and suffering from crystals sprouting from their bodies before becoming crystals themselves to feed Semimaru. The Jetmen nearly lose to her as Gai is affected by Juuza's crystal beam while shielding Kaori from it. After punishing Radiguet to live as a human for his treachery, Juuza resumes her attack as the Jetmen battle her before Gai succumbs to Juuza's spell and dies. With some unexpected assistance from Radiguet, White Swan destroys her forehead crystal after asking for Gai's strength in order to revive everyone she turned into crystals. Enraged that her face is hurt, Juuza assumes her Demon Beast Juuza form as the rest of Vyram and Black Condor join the fight against her as the Jetmen use the Fire Bazooka to defeat her. Near death, she is killed by Radiguet when he throws his sword into her throat just before Semimaru hatched.

Grinam Soldiers
The  are black-skinned grunts born from Grinam seeds. They are armed with axes and capable of launching explosive shells from their hands. The group were later summoned by Zaigan during Super Sentai World.

Production
Chojin Sentai Jetman is the first Sentai series that paid homage to another show, Science Ninja Team Gatchaman with the same birds and the Jet Garuda being a clear influence of God Phoenix. There is also some influence from the 1985 American movie The Breakfast Club. Ryu wears a sports jacket very similar to Andy and is also the more athletic of the group, Kaori, the princess, like Claire; Raita the geek, like Brian; Gai, the bad boy, like John; Ako the greedy girl similar to Allison being a Kleptomaniac. Developed before the ending of Chikyuu Sentai Fiveman, Toei chose Keita Amemiya to be the series' director and searched for actors who would play the main characters. One of them was Toshihide Wakamatsu who would go on to play Gai Yuki/Black Condor. Before the series, the members were all referred to by their color but both Amemiya and Suzuki said that "this [was] unnatural" and decided the characters to refer to each other by their names instead of their colors. Episodes without the characters transforming and fighting were also proposed but was opposed by Bandai until the later half of the series.

The more mature themes such as drama, romantic love triangles and tragedy were in the series' after Takeyuki Suzuki watched Tosho Daimos, and wanted to capture its "high romance". Both the comedy and dramatic tones influenced the series' overall popularity and had become its defining part.

Episodes

Related media

Novels
Following the conclusion of the TV series, the series main screenwriter, Toshiki Inoue, wrote a trilogy of Jetman novels from 1992 to 1995 that retold the events of the TV series. The novels were written specifically for adult fans of the TV series and included mature content, such as detailed descriptions of sexual intercourse between Ryu and Rie, Gai and Kaori, and Radiguet and Maria. Empress Jūza, a one-off villain in the series, had an extended role while the Dimensional Beasts and giant robots were eliminated, with the Jetmen fighting humans subjected to the Vyram's experiments instead.

Manga
A manga sequel to Jetman was published in 1996 authored by Akiko Fujii, in cooperation with the series' writing team (still under the Saburo Yatsude pen name). It was titled . Set five years after the series (and, therefore, two years after the story ends), it shows the four remaining Jetmen rejoining to battle a revived Radiguet, who had possessed Tranza's broken body. Radiguet kidnaps Ryu and Kaori's one-year-old daughter Aya Tendo and, much in the same way he turned Rie into Maria before, he accelerates her growth and brainwashes her into becoming Ruma, whom he considers a daughter. Meanwhile, Gai's empty spot in the team is filled by a young rock guitarist called , who is empowered by Birdonic Waves after a meteorite crashes next to him, and becomes  whose suit is Green instead of Black. In this manga series, the Jetmen uniform is slightly different, with the helmets more closely resembling those of Gatchaman (translucent, protruding visors, and uncovered faces).

Video game
A video game version of Chojin Sentai Jetman was released for the Famicom on December 21, 1991. The game was published by Angel Time (a subsidiary of Bandai) and developed by Natsume. It is a single-player side-scrolling action game where the player assumes role one of the Jetmen members as they fight against the forces of Vyram. The player can choose which Jetman they want to control at the start of each stage, each having their own weapon and maximum hit points:
 Red Hawk and Black Condor: Bringer Sword, 8 hit points
 Yellow Owl: Wing Gauntlet, 7 hit points
 Blue Swallow and White Swan: Bird Blasters, 6 hit points

The initial five stages, Area A to Area E, can be played in any order, while the sixth and final stage, Area F, becomes available once the others have cleared. Each stage begins with a standard side-scrolling level in which the player fight their way to the end of the level in order to reach the stage's boss. Each Jetman has three types of attack: a weapon attack, a kick, and a special attack that destroys all enemies, but can only be used once (unless a replenishment is found). The boss segments consists of one-on-one battles between the team's giant robot, the Great Icarus, and a giant monster (all of them based on monsters from the show). The player has a four-level power gauge that will gradually fill up during the course of battle, which can be used to perform one of four possible special attacks.

The following is a list of bosses in the game and the stages where they appear:
 Mirror Dimension (Area A)
 Camera Dimension (Area B)
 Bus Dimension (Area C)
 Light Armadillo (Area D)
 Dimensional Mammoth (Area E)
 Destruction Beast Semimaru (Area F)

The game features four difficulty settings, a password option, and a Battle Mode where the player can fight against any of the first five bosses.

Cast
: 
: 
:  (Credited under )
: 
: 
: 
: 
/:  (Credited under 丸山 真穂 that shares the same reading)
:  (Credited under )
: 
 :  (Credited under )
: 
Narrator:

Songs
Opening theme

Lyrics: 
Composition/Arrangement: 
Artist: 

Ending theme

Lyrics: Toyohisa Araki
Composition: Kōji Tsuno
Arrangement: 
Artist: Hironobu Kageyama

International Broadcasts and Home Video
In its' home country of Japan, this series was released on VHS and it was the very first Super Sentai series to get a full release in this format with all episodes included, spread throughout 11 volumes from April 1992 to February 1993. Each volume had five episodes with the last two volumes only having three episodes each. From June 21, 2005 to October 21, 2005, the series was then re-released on DVD and spread through five volumes containing 2 discs with 10 episodes each, with Volume 4 having 11 episodes. On May 11, 2022, to commemorate with the 30th anniversary of the series' conclusion, a collection set spread through two volumes were released with the first volume having 25 episodes, the second having 26.
In France, this was the seventh and the very last of the original Super Sentai series to be dubbed and aired on TV in the country. It premiered on April 14, 1993 on TF1's Club Dorothée block, with only 28 episodes aired and dubbed in French. Some episodes were skipped as psychologists from the network claimed that the series was deemed too violent to be airing and it was then suddenly taken off the channel. Then one year later, they would dub and broadcast Mighty Morphin Power Rangers instead of Kyōryū Sentai Zyuranger due to Saban weighing competition in most international markets. 
In Malaysia, the series was released with an English dub by Speedy Video and there also exists a Malay dub as well. Both dubbed versions were released on VCD and VHS. 
In Thailand, three different Thai dubs exist for the series, with two airing on two different channels and one for home video release. 
In the Philippines, the series aired with a Filipino dub on ABS-CBN from 1994 to 1995 and later re-aired on RPN and ABC-5 (now TV5). 
In Hong Kong, the series aired on TVB Jade with a Cantonese Chinese dub on February 28, 1999 until December 11, 1999 with all the episodes dubbed and broadcast. 
In Indonesia, the series aired with an Indonesian dub in 2000 on Indosiar and was also released on home video. 
In Spain, the show was dubbed to Basque and all the episodes were broadcast in EITB (the only entry in the Super Sentai franchise to ever be given a Basque dub), from 1995 to 1996/1997. Even being part of the same country, this show was never dubbed to Castilian Spanish. 
An unofficial Latin Spanish dub was also aired in Venezuela on regional TV.
In North America, the series would receive a DVD release by Shout! Factory on September 25, 2018 in the original Japanese audio with English subtitles. It is the tenth Super Sentai series to be officially released in the region and is the very first pre-Mighty Morphin Sentai to ever be released on DVD.

Reception
As of 2015, the series has become one of the most popular and darkest entries in Super Sentai. It officially gained a much wider audience and got a rating of 7.1% average, beating Fiveman's 6.5%. Despite the series also receiving criticism for adding "romance drama to a children's show", Gai Yuki became an instant hit with Japanese mothers, who sent clemency pleas to TV Asahi so that they did not kill him off. It is still today considered to Sentai fans a masterpiece and topped the number 1 popular vote in both Bandai's B-CLUB magazine and Toei's "Super Sentai Request Tournament".

In the end, total revenue from the series greatly exceeded 15 billion yen.

Jetman was one of the Super Sentai series originally going to be adapted into the first season of Mighty Morphin Power Rangers, but Saban chose its successor, Kyōryū Sentai Zyuranger to be the first instead.

Notes

References

External links

 Chojin Sentai Jetman at the official Super Sentai website 

1990s Japanese television series
1991 Japanese television series debuts
1992 Japanese television series endings
Angel games
Japanese action television series
Japanese fantasy television series
Japanese science fiction television series
Super Sentai
Fictional soldiers
Television series about birds